"What If" is a song by Creed, released as the second single from their 1999 album Human Clay.

Writing and recording
"What If" was written by singer Scott Stapp and guitarist Mark Tremonti. Along with the rest of Human Clay, the song was recorded at a house outside of Tallahassee. Lead singer Scott Stapp moved there after reading that Jim Morrison had lived in Tallahassee.

Music and lyrics
In the song, Scott Stapp sings about hatred and those who oppress others. According to guitarist Mark Tremonti, the intro was inspired by the 1966 song "Paint It, Black" by The Rolling Stones. Along with "Bullets", it is one of Creed's heaviest songs.

Music video
The music video, directed by David Meyers, portrayed Creed band members being "killed" by the Ghostface character from the Scream films. The video features actor David Arquette. The music video can be found on the DVD and VHS releases of Scream 3.

Appearances in media
The song was used in the film Scream 3 in 2000, for which Creed helped to produce the soundtrack. The song was performed by Chris Daughtry on the fifth season of American Idol in 2006.

Chart performance

Year-end charts

References 

2000 singles
Creed (band) songs
Songs written by Mark Tremonti
Songs written by Scott Stapp
1999 songs
Wind-up Records singles

Music videos directed by Dave Meyers (director)